Colby Genoway (born December 12, 1983) is a Canadian professional ice hockey player. He is currently an unrestricted free agent who most recently played for Kölner Haie of the German Deutsche Eishockey Liga (DEL).

Playing career
On July 11, 2006, he was signed by the Anaheim Ducks of the NHL as a free agent to a two-year contract. A few months later, on January 24, 2007, he was traded to the Vancouver Canucks for Joe Rullier. However, he never got to play with either of these two teams in the NHL. He played for the Hartford Wolf Pack, the  Portland Pirates and the Manitoba Moose in the AHL instead. He went on to play in Sweden, Finland and Czech Republic before making his way to Switzerland in 2010.

Lausanne HC
Genoway made his National League A debut playing with HC Lugano during the 2010–11 NLA season. At the end of that season, he signed a three-year contract with Lausanne HC as they were still playing in the second tier National League B. They went on to win the National League B title and to get promoted in April 2013, upsetting SC Langnau Tigers in the promotion-relegation game, after many unfruitful attempts including 2 promotion-relegation games lost to EHC Biel over 8 years spent playing in second division. That year, Genoway was also nominated for the Best National League B Player 2013 award at the Swiss Golden Player Award ceremony in Basle, Switzerland.

In the 2013–14 season, he tallied 26 points in 42 games  and contributed to LHC clinching a playoff spot in the Swiss elite league for the first time in the club's history. They went on to push the top seed ZSC Lions to a seventh game that LHC lost 1–0 in Zurich. Genoway got two assists in that series. On March 27, 2014, Lausanne HC announced that Genoway's contract had been automatically renewed after the promotion in April 2013. On April 2, 2014, the club released a statement regarding the state of the current contracts and additions to the roster for the 2014–15 season. That statement confirmed that the promotion had actually granted Genoway a 2-year extension to his deal (and not only one as previously stated).

Genoway played his first game of the 2014–15 season on November 11, 2014, after a long wrist injury that necessitated surgery. He played 6 games in a row (while Ossi Louhivaara and Juha-Pekka Hytönen were sidelined) before getting injured again. When Daniel Bång suffered a concussion, Genoway got to play a seventh game and scored his first point of the season (an assist) in the win over Biel (3-2) on January 25, 2015. On February 20, 2015, he scored his first (and only) goal of the season, once again against Biel in yet another 3–2 win. As Bång's injury proved to be season-ending, Genoway also got to play most of the 7-game playoff series against Bern. LHC ended up losing that close matchup 2–1 in overtime in the deciding game. Interviewed by local newspaper 24 Heures during the  2014–15 playoffs, Genoway said that he'd like to stay at the club until the end of his contract in 2016 but not as a fifth wheel among imports (behind Hytönen, Bång, Louhivaara and Harri Pesonen) as was the case at the time.

KHL and Switzerland
Genoway ended up leaving Switzerland to join Medvescak Zagreb in the KHL on a one-year contract at the end of that season. On February 2, 2016, after Medvescak didn't qualify for the playoffs, he signed a deal for the rest of the season with HC Fribourg-Gottéron in the NLA he had left a few months before. According to Fribourg newspaper La Liberté, the Canadian center's contract with Zagreb was still valid and he should therefore start the following season in the KHL in spite of the original announcement that he had only been signed for a year. Eventually, the Zagreb team announced in July 2016, that Genoway would return for the 2016-17 campaign. He made 48 appearances for the team that season, scoring nine goals while assisting on 16 more. He then left Medvescak in January 2017 and signed with EHC Kloten of the Swiss NLA for the remainder of the 2016-17 campaign. He added 4 assists to his team's tally in 8 regular season games and scored 6 points (1 goal / 5 assists) in the end-of-season playouts. However, his contract was not renewed at the end of that stint and he subsequently signed yet another one-year deal with KHL team HC Slovan Bratislava.

Germany 
On May 23, 2018, he signed as a free agent to a one-year deal with Kölner Haie of the German DEL.

International play
In December 2014, Colby Genoway was selected by head coach Guy Boucher to represent Canada at the Spengler Cup in Davos for the second time after 2013. Genoway tallied two assists and Team Canada ended up losing to Genève-Servette in the semifinals. He joined Team Canada in Davos for the third time in December 2016. Genoway didn't score any points but his team ended up lifting the trophy after dismissing Lugano 5–2 in the final.

Personal
Genoway's brother, Chay, also plays in the KHL and is a member of the Canadian men's ice hockey team at the 2018 Winter Olympics.

Career statistics

References

External links

1983 births
Living people
Canadian ice hockey forwards
HC Fribourg-Gottéron players
Hartford Wolf Pack players
Ilves players
EHC Kloten players
Kölner Haie players
HC Lugano players
Lausanne HC players
Manitoba Moose players
KHL Medveščak Zagreb players
Mora IK players
North Dakota Fighting Hawks men's ice hockey players
HC Dynamo Pardubice players
Portland Pirates players
People from Morden, Manitoba
Ice hockey people from Manitoba
HC Slovan Bratislava players
Canadian expatriate ice hockey players in the Czech Republic
Canadian expatriate ice hockey players in Slovakia
Canadian expatriate ice hockey players in Croatia
Canadian expatriate ice hockey players in Finland
Canadian expatriate ice hockey players in Germany
Canadian expatriate ice hockey players in Switzerland
Canadian expatriate ice hockey players in Sweden
Canadian expatriate ice hockey players in the United States